The Wisconsin State Baseball League is an amateur summer baseball league based in the states of Wisconsin and Illinois.  It is a Class A division of amateur baseball in the State of Wisconsin.  

As of the 2017 season, the league comprises six teams. Most league games are seven-inning doubleheaders on weekends, and 9 inning games on Wednesday nights. The weekend schedule enables WSBL teams to play in multiple leagues each season.

Teams

References

Summer baseball leagues
Baseball leagues in Illinois
Baseball leagues in Wisconsin
1970 establishments in Wisconsin
Sports leagues established in 1970